WAFN (1310 kHz) is a commercial AM radio station licensed to Priceville, Alabama, that serves Decatur and the western portion of the Huntsville radio market. The station is owned by Fun Radio Group of North Alabama, LLC, along with WAFN-FM in Arab, Alabama. WAFN 1310 and WAFN-FM 92.7 simulcast a classic hits radio format.

By day, WAFN 1310 broadcasts at 1,000 watts. But to protect other stations on 1310 AM from interference, at night it reduces power to 33 watts. Programming is also heard on FM translator W285EN at 104.9 MHz.

History
This station was granted its original construction permit by the Federal Communications Commission on December 19, 1983. The station was assigned the call letters WJRA from February 1984 until September 7, 2001, when it was assigned WQAH by the FCC. WJRA received its license to cover on December 2, 1986.

The station was assigned the call sign WKZD on February 2, 2009.

Effective October 31, 2021, Somerville Baptist Church sold WKZD and translator W285EN to Fun Radio Group of North Alabama for $85,000. Fun Radio changed the call sign to WAFN on November 10, 2021, simulcasting a classic hits format with co-owned WAFN-FM 92.7.

Translator
WAFN also broadcasts on the following FM translator:

References

External links

AFN (AM)
Radio stations established in 1986
Morgan County, Alabama
1986 establishments in Alabama
Classic hits radio stations in the United States